Henry Philpott may refer to:

 Henry Philpott (cricketer) (1829–1880), British cricketer
 Henry Philpott (bishop) (1807–1892), Vice-Chancellor, University of Cambridge

See also
 Henry Phillpotts (1778–1869), bishop of Exeter